The Carmen Conde Women's Poetry Award is a Spanish literary prize organized by   and dedicated exclusively to women authors. It is named in tribute to the writer Carmen Conde Abellán, the first woman to be named an academic numerary of the Royal Spanish Academy. The publishing company, Torremozas, was founded by poet  to promote women's literature.

Winners

References

External links
 Carmen Conde Award at Ediciones Torremozas

1984 establishments in Spain
Awards established in 1984
Poetry awards
Spanish literary awards